The 2022 Fresno State Bulldogs football team represented California State University, Fresno as a member of the Mountain West Conference during the 2022 NCAA Division I FBS football season. They were led by head coach Jeff Tedford, who was coaching his fourth overall season with the program. The Bulldogs played their home games at Valley Children’s Stadium in Fresno, California.

Schedule
Fresno State and the Mountain West Conference announced the 2022 football schedule on February 16, 2022.

Rankings

Roster

Game summaries

Cal Poly

Oregon State

No. 7 USC

UConn

Boise State

San Jose State

New Mexico

San Diego State

Hawaii

UNLV

Nevada

Wyoming

at Boise State (Mountain West Championship Game)

vs. Washington State (LA Bowl)

References

Fresno State
Fresno State Bulldogs football seasons
Mountain West Conference football champion seasons
Fresno State Bulldogs football
LA Bowl champion seasons